Lom Peak is a peak rising to 870 m in Friesland Ridge, Tangra Mountains, Livingston Island in the South Shetland Islands, Antarctica which overlooks Ruen Icefall to the north.  It is named after the Bulgarian town of Lom.

Location

Maps
 L.L. Ivanov et al. Antarctica: Livingston Island and Greenwich Island, South Shetland Islands. Scale 1:100000 topographic map. Sofia: Antarctic Place-names Commission of Bulgaria, 2005.
 L.L. Ivanov. Antarctica: Livingston Island and Greenwich, Robert, Snow and Smith Islands. Scale 1:120000 topographic map.  Troyan: Manfred Wörner Foundation, 2009.

External links
 Lom Peak. SCAR Composite Antarctic Gazetteer
 Bulgarian Antarctic Gazetteer. Antarctic Place-names Commission. (details in Bulgarian, basic data in English)

External links
 Lom Peak. Copernix satellite image

Tangra Mountains